The North Fork Merced River is a tributary of the Merced River in Mariposa County, California. The river originates in the foothills of the Sierra Nevada in the Stanislaus National Forest and flows generally south through a canyon to join the Merced River near Bagby.

References

Rivers of Mariposa County, California